Sir Alastair Cook is a retired English cricketer and former captain of the England cricket team. He scored centuries (100 or more runs in a single innings) in Test and One Day International (ODI) matches on 33 and 5 occasions respectively. In a career that spanned from 2006 to 2018, he played 161 Tests and 92 ODIs for England, scoring 12,472 and 3,204 runs respectively. He is the joint youngest batsman to score 10,000 or more runs in Test cricket, and has scored the most Test runs as an opening batsman. Cook was appointed a Commander of the Order of the British Empire (CBE) in the 2016 Birthday Honours. In 2011, the International Cricket Council (ICC) selected him as their Test Player of the Year. Wisden named him as one of their cricketers of the year in 2012.

Cook made his Test debut against India at the Vidarbha Cricket Association Ground, Nagpur in 2006. He became the sixteenth English cricketer to score a century on Test debut when he scored 104 in the second innings. His score of 294, against the same team at the Edgbaston Cricket Ground, Birmingham, in 2011, is the sixth highest total by an English batsman in Test cricket. Cook has scored Test centuries at 24 cricket grounds, including 17 outside England. He has scored centuries against all eight Test opponents the team has played and scored the most centuries (seven) against India. In May 2015, Cook became England's all-time leading run scorer in Tests, when he went past Graham Gooch's tally of 8900 runs. , he ranks equal tenth among players with most Test centuries, and top of the equivalent list for England. His 38 centuries across all formats is the highest by an English cricketer.

Cook made his ODI debut in 2006 against Sri Lanka at Old Trafford, Manchester. His first century came against India at the Rose Bowl, Southampton, in August 2007. His highest score of 137 runs was made against Pakistan at the Zayed Sports City Stadium, Abu Dhabi, in 2011. Cook played four Twenty20 International (T20I) matches between 2007 and 2009, without scoring a century.

Key
 *  Remained not out
   Man of the match
   Captain of England in that match

Test cricket centuries

One Day International centuries

References

Centuries, Cook
Cook, Alastair